Kecheng is a district of the city of Quzhou, Zhejiang Province, China.

Administrative divisions
As of 2020, Kecheng Districthas 8 Subdistricts and 2 Towns and 8 Townships under its administration

Subdistricts:
Fushan Subdistrict (府山街道), Hehua Subdistrict (荷花街道), Huayuan Subdistrict (花园街道), Xin'an Subdistrict (信安街道), Baiyun Subdistrict (白云街道), Shuanggang Subdistrict (双港街道), Xinxin Subdistrict (新新街道), Quhua Subdisteict (衢化街道)

Towns:
Shiliang (石梁镇), Hangbu (航埠镇)

Townships:
Wantian Township (万田乡), Shishi Township (石室乡), Huangjia Township (黄家乡), Jiangjiashan Township (姜家山乡), Jiuhua Township (九华乡), Qili Township (七里乡), Huashu Township (华墅乡), Gouxi Township (沟溪乡)

Tourism
The district is rich in cultural traditions, such as the Mapeng Catholic Church.

References

Districts of Zhejiang
Quzhou